Rajdooth is a 2019 Telugu language film co-directed by Arjun Gunnala and Carthyk. The film stars debutant Meghamsh and Nakshatara in the lead roles.

Cast 
 Meghamsh as Sanjay
 Nakshatra Babu as Priya
 Adhitya as Rajanna
 Kota Srinivasa Rao as Sanjay's grandfather
 Manobala as Lender
 Anish Kuruvilla as Priya's father
 Ravi Varma as Rajannason
 Nellore Sudarshan as Sanjay's friend
 Nalla Venu as Donka
 Bhadram as Petrol Bunk Person

Production 
Meghamash, the 19-year-old older son of late Srihari and Disco Shanti, was cast to make his film debut. The crew of the film are all debutants as well. The film is named Rajdooth after the motorcycle of the same name.

Soundtrack

Release 
The film released to mixed reviews.

The Hindu wrote that "The film is technically okay but would do itself a favour if trimmed by another ten minutes. The comedians try to salvage the film... but in vain".

References

External links

2010s Telugu-language films